Main Teri Tu Mera is a 2016 Indian Punjabi-language film directed by Ksshitij Chaudhary, written by Pali Bhupinder Singh and starring Roshan Prince, Yamini Malhotra, Mankirt Aulakh, Jazz Sodhi, Karamjit Anmol. The film was released on 19 August 2016. The movie has been majorly shot in border areas of village Ferozepur very near to Pakistan and some scenes of movie have also been shot in Chandigarh. Malhotra, Aulakh and Sodhi make their Punjabi film debut in Main Teri Tu Mera.

The story revolves around a rural boy called Amru who is a day dreamer. He starts dreaming of a girl (Jazz Sodhi) who suddenly appears in real and tells him that they both are already married.

Cast
 Roshan Prince as Amarjit a.k.a. Amru
 Mankirt Aulakh as Keerat
 Yamini Malhotra as Kammo
 Jazz Sodhi as Simran
 Karamjit Anmol
 Anita Devgan as Amru's mother
 Mannat Singh as Amarjit's sister-in-law
 Gurpreet Kaur Bhangu as Amarjit's Aunt 
 Harinder Bhullar as Amarjit's brother
 Parminder Gill as Kammo's Mother

Track list

References

External links
 Main Teri Tu Mera trailer

Main Teri Tu Mera - Roshan Prince on Djbaap

2016 films
Punjabi-language Indian films
2010s Punjabi-language films